Ajinkyatara (literally "The Impregnable Star") is a fort on one of the seven mountains surrounding the city of Satara in the Sahayadri Mountains of Maharashtra, India. It is a 16th-century fort, that was called "Ajimtara", during Aurangzeb regime and was based on Aurangzeb son's name, Ajim. Maharani tarabai capturev and renamed Ajinkyatara.", when he wrote his first novel on the same name, first published in 1909. Now it also holds the television tower for the city of Satara. This fort has been the place where several pivotal moments in Maratha history took place.

The fort is located at Ajinkyatara Mountain, which is 3,300 feet high.

After the death of Shivaji Maharaj, Aurangzeb conquered Satara fort, which was later won by Parshuram Pratinidhi in 1706. In 1708, Shahu Maharaj was crowned at this fort.

The fortress is also mentioned in Nathmadhav's novel Veer Dhaval, in which the eponymous protagonist, a vassal of the Chalukyas, is the rightful master of the fort (and takes final possession of it at the novel's end) which has been under the misrule of his uncle Chanda Varma, who usurped the fort after murdering the protagonist's father Keerti Varma.

Access to Ajinkyatara is possible by road (2 hours from Pune, 4 hours from Mumbai), train (the nearest station is Satara Road) or plane (nearest airport is Pune).

See also
List of forts in Maharashtra

External links

Ajinkyatara Fort Satara

References

Forts in Satara district
Forts in Maharashtra
Buildings and structures of the Maratha Empire